Wakaw Lake is a lake near Wakaw, Saskatchewan, Canada. It is located within a 1-hour drive to the north-east of the city of Saskatoon, Saskatchewan (102 kilometres), and 73 kilometres to the south of the city of Prince Albert, Saskatchewan. It takes its name from a Cree word meaning "crooked", referring to the curved shape of the lake. The lake is known in Cree as ''ᐚᑳᐤ ᓵᑲᐦᐃᑲᐣ wâkâw sâkahikan''''.

There are currently about 800 cabins located on the lake, some of which are winterised and occupied year-round. Some of these cabins have permanent boat houses, but a bylaw has been issued that no more boat houses are to be built. Some cabin-owners are getting around this by rigging up temporary coveralls.

In general, the bottom of the lake is muddy, shallow and covered in seaweed, but there are a few areas where a deep, rocky bottom is found.

Wakaw Lake Regional Park 
Wakaw Lake Regional Park has a campground with over 150 campsites, a 9-hole golf course, and a restaurant. It is a long, narrow body of water situated in aspen parkland and home to several species of fish including northern pike, walleye, and perch. While not a deep lake, it still suffices for some watersports.

See also
List of protected areas of Saskatchewan
List of lakes of Saskatchewan

References

External links

 Map showing location of Wakaw Lake
Wakaw Lake Regional Park Website

Hoodoo No. 401, Saskatchewan
Lakes of Saskatchewan
Division No. 15, Saskatchewan